Heart & Soul is an album of duets by bassist Ron Carter and pianist Cedar Walton that was recorded in 1981 and released on the Dutch Timeless label.

Reception

Allmusic awarded the album 3 stars, stating: "Heart & Soul is certainly not a loose 'blowing session'; it's clear that the duo's repertoire had carefully developed during a year of gigging together in Manhattan. At the same time, the music never feels overarranged and stiff; there is always room for spontaneity.... Recommended."

Track listing 
All compositions by Ron Carter except as indicated
 "Heart and Soul" (Hoagy Carmichael, Frank Loesser) – 3:04
 "Django" (John Lewis) – 5:35
 "Frankie and Johnnie" (Traditional) – 4:59
 "Little Waltz" – 6:38
 "Telephone" – 3:16
 "My Funny Valentine" (Lorenz Hart, Richard Rodgers) – 7:41
 "Back to Bologna" (Cedar Walton) – 4:14
 "A Beautiful Friendship" (Donald Kahn, Stanley Styne) – 4:59

Personnel 
Cedar Walton – piano 
Ron Carter – bass

References 

Ron Carter albums
Cedar Walton albums
1982 albums
Timeless Records albums